Wollaston College  (formerly  John Wollaston Theological College ) is an Australian educational institution in Perth, Western Australia, established in 1957. It provides theological education for both lay and ordained people of the Anglican Diocese of Perth, as well as forms candidates for ordination in the Anglican Church of Australia. Wollaston Theological College is a constituent college of the University of Divinity.

Origins

The first theological college for the Perth diocese was St John's College, founded by Charles Lefroy in 1899 and which closed in 1929. From its closure in 1929 to the opening of Wollaston in 1957, 49 candidates were sent to the Eastern States for theological training: 23 to St Barnabas' College, Adelaide, 14 to St John's College, Morpeth, six to St Michael's House, Crafers, three to Ridley College, Melbourne, two to St Francis's College, Brisbane, and one to Moore College, Sydney. It speaks for the churchmanship of Perth at the time that only four candidates attended the two Evangelical colleges (Ridley and Moore).

In 1950 the Perth Diocesan Synod resolved to establish a theological college. In 1956 the City of Perth agreed to sell five acres to the Diocese, and in the same year the Rev Tony Pierce was appointed first Warden.  Archbishop Moline's intention was to have a college that was neither 'high' nor 'low'. The college was located in the Perth suburb of Mount Claremont. Its centrepiece was the Chapel designed by noted architect Julius Elischer, influenced by Le Corbusier's Notre-Dame du Haut in Ronchamp, France. The founding and only Warden of this period of full-time post-secondary residential theological education was C. A. Pierce, Chaplain of Magdalene College, Cambridge and a noted New Testament scholar.

Courses and programmes
From 1957 to 1970 ordinands from Perth and the other West Australian dioceses undertook a largely residential program based on Wollaston, typically studying for the Licentiate or Diploma in Theology of the Australian College of Theology. The course programme changed significantly over the years. Initially the intention was that students should complete the ThL (Licentiate in Theology) in the first two years of residence, followed by a third year of Honours.

In 1970 under new Archbishop Geoffrey Sambell the Diocese of Perth changed its policy, with the result that the first two years of training for ordination candidates were spent at a residential theological college elsewhere in Australia, followed by a third year of practical training based at Wollaston with ordination to the diaconate at the start of that year. This directly led to the resignation of Pierce as Warden. For more than a decade students from WA were thus again sent away to study, and the Wollaston campus became in large part a retreat and conference centre for the Diocese. While the name "John Wollaston Theological College" was retained, wardens of this period were administrators sometimes engaged in retreat conducting and spiritual direction, as well as working with the deacon-interns and in post-ordination training.

When local theological education recommenced in 1983 in conjunction with the Perth College of Divinity and Murdoch University at the initiative of Archbishop Peter Carnley, Wollaston again become a centre for local formation of degree-seeking students, but on a non-resident basis and not as the primary center for teaching. It has continued in this mode, with some changes in specific programmes; in 2020 Murdoch University announced its intention to cease theological teaching, and Wollaston announced a partnership with the Theological School of Trinity College, Melbourne, to teach for degrees of the University of Divinity.

From 2022, Wollaston Theological College became a full constituent college of the University of Divinity and offers a range of fully accredited undergraduate and postgraduate awards.

Chapel
The chapel, which has no dedication, is the dominant feature of the college site. It was designed by the Hungarian-born Perth architect, Julius Elischer. There is no set place for the altar or any furniture, to enable it to be configured in multiple ways. The design is based strongly on Le Corbusier's Chapel of Notre-Dame du Haut in Ronchamp, built ten years earlier. (Elischer had worked under Ferninand Streb, a pupil of Le Corbusier's.) Like Notre Dame du Haut, the stark white interior is punctuated by deep-set windows of different coloured glass. The architect's vision was of a 'tent of meeting'. It was consecrated in 1965 by Michael Ramsey, the then Archbishop of Canterbury.

Wardens
Claude Anthony Pierce, 1956-70
Richard Franklin Appleby, 1972-75 Appleby was subsequently Dean of Bathurst, 1980–83, Assistant Bishop of Newcastle, 1983–92, Bishop of the Northern Territory, 1992–99.
David Oswald Robarts, 1976-79 Robarts was subsequently Dean of Perth, 1979–89.
John Warren Forsyth, 1979-82
Dennis John Reynolds, 1983-85
George Edward Trippe, 1985-90
Roger Thomas Sharr, 1992-2000
Nigel Leaves, 2000-09
?, 2009–15
Gregory John Norman Search, 2015-20
Ric Barrett-Lennard, 2021 (acting)
Raewynne Whiteley, 2022

Current faculty
Dr Christy Capper, Lecturer in Systematic Theology
Dr Mark Jennings, Senior Lecturer in Religion
Dr Robert Myles, Senior Lecturer in New Testament
Professor Rowan Strong, Professor of Church History
Dr Raewynnne Whiteley, Lecturer in Practical Theology

References

Anglican seminaries and theological colleges
Education in Perth, Western Australia
1957 establishments in Australia
University of Divinity
Educational institutions established in 1957